The adoption of plug-in electric vehicles in the United States is supported by the American federal government, and several states and local governments. , cumulative sales in the U.S. totaled 2.32 million highway legal plug-in electric cars since 2010, led by all-electric cars. The American stock represented 20% of the global plug-in car fleet in use by the end of 2019, and the U.S. had the world's third largest stock of plug-in passenger cars after China (47%) and Europe (25%).

The U.S. market share of plug-in electric passenger cars increased from 0.14% in 2011, to 0.66% in 2015, to 1.13% in 2017, and achieved a record market share of 2.1% in 2018, slightly declined to 1.9% in 2019, then rising to 4.6% by the start of 2022.California is the largest plug-in car regional market in the country, with almost 835,000 plug-in electric vehicles sold by the end of 2020.

, the Tesla Model 3 all-electric car is the all-time best selling plug-in electric car with an estimated 395,600 units delivered, followed by the Tesla Model S electric car with about 172,400, and the Chevrolet Volt plug-in hybrid with 157,125 units of both generations. The Model S was the best selling plug-in car in the U.S. for three consecutive years, from 2015 to 2017, and the Model 3 also has topped sales for three years running, from 2018 to 2020.

, Washington, D.C. and 37 states and had established incentives and tax or fee exemptions for BEVs and PHEVs, or utility-rate breaks, and other non-monetary incentives such as free parking and high-occupancy vehicle lane access.

Overview by state
Articles about plug-in electric vehicles in individual states:

 Alabama
 Alaska
 Arizona
 Arkansas
 California
 Colorado
 Connecticut
 Delaware
 District of Columbia
 Florida
 Georgia
 Hawaii
 Idaho
 Illinois
 Indiana
 Iowa
 Kansas
 Kentucky
 Louisiana
 Maine
 Maryland
 Massachusetts
 Michigan
 Minnesota
 Mississippi
 Missouri
 Montana
 Nebraska
 Nevada
 New Hampshire
 New Jersey
 New Mexico
 New York
 North Carolina
 North Dakota
 Ohio
 Oklahoma
 Oregon
 Pennsylvania
 Rhode Island
 South Carolina
 South Dakota
 Tennessee
 Texas
 Utah
 Vermont
 Virginia
 Washington
 West Virginia
 Wisconsin
 Wyoming

Government support

In his 2011 State of the Union address, President Barack Obama set the goal for the U.S. to become the first country to have one million electric vehicles on the road by 2015. This goal was established based on forecasts made by the U.S. Department of Energy (DoE), using production capacity of PEV models announced to enter the U.S. market through 2015. The DoE estimated a cumulative production of 1,222,200 PEVS by 2015, and was based on manufacturer announcements and media reports accounting production goals for the Fisker Karma, Fisker Nina, Ford Transit Connect, Ford Focus Electric, Chevrolet Volt, Nissan Leaf, Smith Newton, Tesla Roadster, Tesla Model S and Th!nk City.

Considering that actual PEV sales were lower than initially expected, as of early 2013, several industry observers have concluded that this goal was unattainable. Obama's goal was achieved only in September 2018.

In 2008, San Francisco Mayor Gavin Newsom, San Jose Mayor Chuck Reed and Oakland Mayor Ron Dellums announced a nine-step policy plan for transforming the Bay Area into the "Electric Vehicle (EV) Capital of the U.S.". Other local and state governments have also expressed interest in electric cars.

Governor of California Jerry Brown issued an executive order in March 2012 that established the goal of getting 1.5 million zero-emission vehicles (ZEVs) on California roads by 2025.

American Recovery and Reinvestment Act 

President Barack Obama pledged  billion in federal grants to support the development of next-generation electric vehicles and batteries. $1.5 billion in grants to U.S. based manufacturers to produce highly efficient batteries and their components; up to $500 million in grants to U.S. based manufacturers to produce other components needed for electric vehicles, such as electric motors and other components; and up to $400 million to demonstrate and evaluate plug-in hybrids and other electric infrastructure concepts—like truck stop charging station, electric rail, and training for technicians to build and repair electric vehicles (green collar jobs).

In March 2009, as part of the American Recovery and Reinvestment Act, the U.S. Department of Energy announced the release of two competitive solicitations for up to $2 billion in federal funding for competitively awarded cost-shared agreements for manufacturing of advanced batteries and related drive components as well as up to $400 million for transportation electrification demonstration and deployment projects. This initiative aimed to help meet President Barack Obama's goal of putting one million plug-in electric vehicles on the road by 2015.

Tax credits

New plug-in electric vehicles

Federal incentives

First the Energy Improvement and Extension Act of 2008, and later the American Clean Energy and Security Act of 2009 (ACES) granted tax credits for new qualified plug-in electric drive motor vehicles. The American Recovery and Reinvestment Act of 2009 (ARRA) also authorized federal tax credits for converted plug-ins, though the credit is lower than for new plug-in electric vehicle (PEV).

As defined by the 2009 ACES Act, a PEV is a vehicle which draws propulsion energy from a traction battery with at least 5 kwh of capacity and uses an offboard source of energy to recharge such battery. The tax credit for new plug-in electric vehicles is worth  plus  for each kilowatt-hour of battery capacity over 5 kwh, and the portion of the credit determined by battery capacity cannot exceed .

The qualified plug-in electric vehicle credit phases out for a plug-in manufacturer over the one-year period beginning with the second calendar quarter after the calendar quarter in which at least 200,000 qualifying plug-in vehicles from that manufacturer have been sold for use in the U.S. Cumulative sales started counting sales after December 31, 2009. After reaching the cap, qualifying PEVs for one quarter still earn the full credit, the second quarter after that quarter plug-in vehicles are eligible for 50% of the credit for six months, then 25% of the credit for another six months and finally the credit is phased out. Both the Nissan Leaf electric vehicle and the Chevrolet Volt plug-in hybrid, launched in December 2010, are eligible for the maximum $7,500 tax credit. The Toyota Prius Plug-in Hybrid, released in January 2012, is eligible for a  tax credit due to its smaller battery capacity of 5.2 kWh. All Tesla cars and the Chevrolet Bolts and BMW i3 BEV are eligible for the  tax credit.

A 2016 study conducted by researchers from the University of California, Davis found that the federal tax credit was the reason behind more than 30% of the plug-in electric sales. The impact of the federal tax incentive is higher among owners of the Nissan Leaf, with up to 49% of sales attributable to the federal incentive. The study, based on a stated preference survey of more than 2,882 plug in vehicle owners in 11 states, also found that the federal tax credit shifts buyers from internal combustion engine vehicles to plug-in vehicles and advances the purchase timing of new vehicles by a year or more.

In July 2018, Tesla Inc. was the first plug-in manufacturer to pass 200,000 sales and the full tax credit will be available until the end 2018, with the phase out beginning in January 2019. General Motors combined sales of plug-in electric vehicles passed 200,000 units in November 2018. The full tax credit will be available until the end of March 2019 and thereafter reduces gradually until it is completely phase out beginning on April 1, 2020. In order of cumulative sales, Nissan has delivered 126,875 units, Ford 111,715, Toyota 93,011 and the BMW Group 79,679 plug-in electric cars.

State incentives

, 37 states and Washington, D.C. have established incentives and tax or fee exemptions for BEVs and PHEVs, or utility-rate breaks, and other non-monetary incentives such as free parking and high-occupancy vehicle lane access regardless of the number of occupants. In California, for example, the Clean Vehicle Rebate Project (CVRP) was established to promote the production and use of zero-emission vehicles (ZEVs). Eligible vehicles include only new Air Resources Board-certified or approved zero-emission or plug-in hybrid electric vehicles. Among the eligible vehicles are neighborhood electric vehicles, battery electric, plug-in hybrid electric, and fuel cell vehicles including cars, trucks, medium- and heavy-duty commercial vehicles, and zero-emission motorcycles. Vehicles must be purchased or leased on or after March 15, 2010. California's zero-emission (ZEV) regulations are anticipated to result in 1.5 million electric vehicles on the road by 2025 ( i.e., 15% sales of total states in 2025); moreover, California's mixed incentives means to reach 40% of electric vehicle sales in the entire U.S.

Electric vehicle purchases made in the U.S. are eligible for $2,500 to $7,500, depending on the make and model of the vehicle, in federal tax credit.

The following table summarizes some of the state incentives:

New proposals

Several separate initiatives have been pursued unsuccessfully at the federal level since 2011 to transform the tax credit into an instant cash rebate. The objective of these initiatives is to make new qualifying plug-in electric cars more accessible to buyers by making the incentive more effective. The rebate would be available at the point of sale allowing consumers to avoid a wait of up to a year to apply the tax credit against income tax returns.

In November 2017, House Republicans proposed scrapping the  tax credit as part of a sweeping tax overhaul.

Charging equipment 
In 2016, the Obama administration and several stake holders announced $4.5 billion in loan guarantees for public charge stations, along with other initiatives.

EV Everywhere Challenge

On March 7, 2012, President Barack Obama launched the EV Everywhere Challenge as part of the U.S. Department of Energy's Clean Energy Grand Challenges, which seeks to solve some of the U.S. biggest energy challenges and make clean energy technologies affordable and accessible to the vast majority of American households and businesses. The EV Everywhere Challenge has the goal of advancing electric vehicle technologies to have the country, by 2022, to produce a five-passenger electric vehicle that would provide both a payback time of less than five years and the ability to be recharged quickly enough to provide enough range for the typical American driver.

In January 2013 the Department of Energy (DoE) published the "EV Everywhere Grand Challenge Blueprint," which set the technical targets of the PEV program in four areas: battery research and development; electric drive system research and development; vehicle lightweighting; and advanced climate control technologies. The DoE set several specific goals, established in consultation with stakeholders. The key goals to be met over the next five years to make plug-in electric vehicles competitive with conventional fossil fuel vehicles are:
Cutting battery costs from their current /kWh to /kWh
Eliminating almost 30% of vehicle weight through lightweighting
Reducing the cost of electric drive systems from /kW to /kW

The DoE aim is to level the purchase plus operating (fuel) cost of an all-electric vehicle with a  range with the costs of an internal combustion engine (ICE) vehicle of similar size.

In order to achieve these goals, the DoE is providing up to  million over the next five years to fund the new Joint Center for Energy Storage Research (JCESR), a research center led by the Argonne National Laboratory in Chicago. An initial progress report for the initiative was released in January 2014. Four results of the first year of the initiative were reported: 
DOE research and development reduced the cost of electric drive vehicle batteries to / kWhr, 50% lower than 2010 costs.
In the first year of the Workplace Charging Challenge, more than 50 U.S. employers joined the Challenge and pledged to provide charging access at more than 150 sites.
DOE investments in EV Everywhere technology topped  in 2013, addressing key barriers to achieving the Grand Challenge.
Consumer acceptance of electric vehicles grew: 97,000 plug-in electric vehicles were sold in 2013, nearly doubling 2012 sales.

Workplace Charging Challenge
In January 2013, during the Washington Auto Show, Secretary of Energy Steven Chu announced an initiative to expand the EV Everywhere program with the "Workplace Charging Challenge." This initiative is a plan to install more electric vehicle charging stations in workplace parking lots. There are 21 founding partners and ambassadors for the program, including Ford, Chrysler, General Motors, Nissan, Tesla Motors, 3M, Google, Verizon, Duke Energy, General Electric, San Diego Gas & Electric, Siemens, Plug In America, and the Rocky Mountain Institute. The initiative's target is to increase the number of U.S. employers offering workplace charging by tenfold in the next five years. Initially, the DoE will not provide funding for this initiative.

U.S. military 

The U.S. Army announced in 2009 that it will lease 4,000 Neighborhood Electric Vehicles (NEVs) within three years. The Army plans to use NEVs at its bases for transporting people around the base, as well as for security patrols and maintenance and delivery services. The Army accepted its first six NEVs at Virginia's Fort Myer in March 2009 and will lease a total of 600 NEVs through the rest of the year, followed by the leasing of 1,600 NEVs for each of the following two years.

U.S. Air Force officials announced, in August 2011, a plan to establish Los Angeles Air Force Base, California, as the first federal facility to replace 100% of its general purpose fleet with plug-in electric vehicles. As part of the program, all Air Force-owned and -leased general purpose fleet vehicles on the base will be replaced with PEVs. There are approximately 40 eligible vehicles, ranging from passenger sedans to two-ton trucks and shuttle buses. The replacement PEVs include all-electric, plug-in hybrids, and extended-range electric vehicles. Electrification of Los Angeles AFB's general purpose fleet is the first step in a Department of Defense effort to establish strategies for large-scale integration of PEVs.

By May 2013, it was announced that, as part of a test program created in January 2013, 500 plug-in electric vehicles with vehicle-to-grid (V2G) technology would be in use at six military bases, purchased using an investment of $20 million. If the program succeeds, there will be 3,000 V2G vehicles in 30 bases.

The National Defense Authorization Act passed in December, 2022, requires new non-combat military vehicles be electric by 2035.

Safety laws 

U.S. commitments to the 2015 Paris Agreement 

As a signatory party to the 2015 Paris Climate Agreement, the United States government committed to reduce its greenhouse gas emissions, among others, from the transportation sector. Already in 2015, the Federal government had set targets to reduce its own carbon footprint 30% by 2025, and acquire 20% of all new passenger vehicles as zero emission (all-electric of fuel cell) or plug-in hybrid by 2020, and 50% by 2025. These goals are part of the U.S. nationally determined contributions (NDCs) to achieve the worldwide emissions reduction goal set by the Paris Agreement.

On June 1, 2017, President Donald Trump announced that the U.S. would cease all participation in the 2015 Paris Agreement on climate change mitigation.

On November 3, 2020, then President-elect Joe Biden announced that his administration will reverse President Donald Trump's United States withdrawal from the Paris Agreement by re-entering the United States into the Paris Agreement to continue to reiterated commitment in the agreement and move forward with the proposed Green New Deal legislation, to fight the global climate change problems as soon as Biden is inaugurated into office on January 20, 2021, succeeding then-outgoing Trump as President of the United States. Joe Biden also criticized Trump for withdrawing and ceasing all US participation from the UN Paris Agreement on June 1, 2017, and as Biden said that withdrawing from the UN Paris Agreement is a huge mistake. Joe Biden promises to introduce and transition to more energy-efficient buildings, increase generation of renewable energy by gradually moving away from the dependence of fracking and fossil fuels as energy sources in the US, transition the entire government fleet to 100% all-electric vehicles by the 2030s, and introduce more electric vehicles to all 50 US states.

, the Biden Administration expects 50% of all vehicles sold in the US to be electric vehicles by 2030 and expects new car sales of fossil fuel vehicles to be banned in the US by the 2035 timeframe, as a result of Joe Biden signing an executive order mandating that 50% of all US car sales must be electric vehicles by 2030. The Biden government plans to accomplish these goals by more incentivizing of electric vehicles, impose hefty government taxes and restrictions on internal-combustion engine vehicles, increase fuel prices for refilling up fossil-fuel vehicles, implement congestion-charge pricing zones, and impose more tougher and stringent Corporate Average Fuel Economy standards and US Environmental Protection Agency regulations on automotive emissions standards, which are all climate change and green energy provisions included in the Build Back Better Act.

In December 2021, the Biden Administration imposed Executive Order 14057, which is a nationwide federal government mandate that will ban new fossil fuel vehicles from all 50 US States plus Washington D.C. and all US Territories by 2035 to push the transition to electric vehicles. The order will ban new car sales of fossil-fuel powered government-owned vehicles by 2027, new fossil-fuel buses by 2030, and new privately-owned and commercial-owned vehicles by 2035. The order also calls for all government fleets to replace their fossil fuel vehicles with 100% all-electric vehicles by 2035, for all fossil fuel buses to be replaced by 100% all-electric buses by 2040, and for all privately-owned and commercial-owned vehicles to be replaced by 100% all-electric vehicles by 2050.

Operating costs and fuel economy

The following table shows the U.S. Environmental Protection Agency (EPA) official ratings for fuel economy (miles per gallon gasoline equivalent) and EPA's estimated out-of-pocket fuel costs for all plug-in electric passenger vehicles rated by EPA in the United States since 2010 up to December 2016.

Air pollution and greenhouse gas emissions

Electric cars, as well as plug-in hybrids operating in all-electric mode, emit no harmful tailpipe pollutants from the onboard source of power, such as particulates (soot), volatile organic compounds, hydrocarbons, carbon monoxide, ozone, lead, and various oxides of nitrogen. The clean air benefit is usually local because, depending on the source of the electricity used to recharge the batteries, air pollutant emissions are shifted to the location of the generation plants. In a similar manner, plug-in electric vehicles operating in all-electric mode do not emit greenhouse gases from the onboard source of power, but from the point of view of a well-to-wheel assessment, the extent of the benefit also depends on the fuel and technology used for electricity generation. From the perspective of a full life cycle analysis, the electricity used to recharge the batteries must be generated from renewable or clean sources such as wind, solar, hydroelectric, or nuclear power for PEVs to have almost none or zero well-to-wheel emissions.

EPA estimates

The following table compares tailpipe and upstream  emissions estimated by the U.S. Environmental Protection Agency for all series production model year 2014 plug-in electric vehicles available in the U.S. market. Total emissions include the emissions associated with the production and distribution of electricity used to charge the vehicle, and for plug-in hybrid electric vehicles, it also includes emissions associated with tailpipe emissions produced from the internal combustion engine. These figures were published by the EPA in October 2014 in its annual report "Light-Duty Automotive Technology, Carbon Dioxide Emissions, and Fuel Economy Trends." All emissions are estimated considering average real world city and highway operation based on the EPA 5-cycle label methodology, using a weighted 55% city and 45% highway driving.

For purposes of an accurate estimation of emissions, the analysis took into consideration the differences in operation between plug-in hybrids. Some, like the Chevrolet Volt, can operate in all-electric mode without using gasoline, and others operate in a blended mode like the Toyota Prius PHV, which uses both energy stored in the battery and energy from the gasoline tank to propel the vehicle, but that can deliver substantial all-electric driving in blended mode. In addition, since the all-electric range of plug-in hybrids depends on the size of the battery pack, the analysis introduced a utility factor as a projection of the share of miles that will be driven using electricity by an average driver, for both, electric only and blended EV modes. Since all-electric cars do not produce tailpipe emissions, the utility factor applies only to plug-in hybrids. The following table shows the overall fuel economy expressed in terms of miles per gallon gasoline equivalent (mpg-e) and the utility factor for the ten MY2014 plug-in hybrids available in the U.S. market, and EPA's best estimate of the  tailpipe emissions produced by these PHEVs.

In order to account for the upstream  emissions associated with the production and distribution of electricity, and since electricity production in the United States varies significantly from region to region, the EPA considered three scenarios/ranges with the low end scenario corresponding to the California powerplant emissions factor, the middle of the range represented by the national average powerplant emissions factor, and the upper end of the range corresponding to the powerplant emissions factor for the Rocky Mountains. The EPA estimates that the electricity GHG emission factors for various regions of the country vary from 346 g /kWh in California to 986 g /kWh in the Rockies, with a national average of 648 g /kWh.

Union of Concerned Scientists

2012 study
The Union of Concerned Scientists (UCS) published a study in 2012 that assessed average greenhouse gas emissions in the U.S. resulting from charging plug-in car batteries from the perspective of the full life-cycle (well-to-wheel analysis) and according to fuel and technology used to generate electric power by region. The study used the Nissan Leaf all-electric car to establish the analysis baseline, and electric-utility emissions are based on EPA's 2009 estimates. The UCS study expressed the results in terms of miles per gallon instead of the conventional unit of grams of greenhouse gases or carbon dioxide equivalent emissions per year in order to make the results more friendly for consumers. The study found that in areas where electricity is generated from natural gas, nuclear, hydroelectric or renewable sources, the potential of plug-in electric cars to reduce greenhouse emissions is significant. On the other hand, in regions where a high proportion of power is generated from coal, hybrid electric cars produce less -e equivalent emissions than plug-in electric cars, and the best fuel efficient gasoline-powered subcompact car produces slightly less emissions than a PEV.

The study concluded that for 45% of the U.S. population, a plug-in electric car will generate lower  equivalent emissions than a gasoline-powered car capable of combined , such as the Toyota Prius and the Prius c.

The following table shows a representative sample of cities within each of the three categories of emissions intensity used in the UCS study, showing the corresponding miles per gallon equivalent for each city as compared to the greenhouse gas emissions of a gasoline-powered car:

2014 update
In September 2014 the UCS published an updated analysis of its 2012 report. The 2014 analysis found that 60% of Americans, up from 45% in 2009, live in regions where an all-electric car produce fewer  equivalent emissions per mile than the most efficient hybrid. The UCS study found several reasons for the improvement. First, electric utilities have adopted cleaner sources of electricity to their mix between the two analysis. The 2014 study used electric-utility emissions based on EPA's 2010 estimates, but since coal use nationwide is down by about 5% from 2010 to 2014, actual efficiency in 2014 is expected to be better than estimated in the UCS study. Second, electric vehicles have become more efficient, as the average model year 2013 all-electric vehicle used 0.325 kWh/mile, representing a 5% improvement over 2011 models. The Nissan Leaf, used as the reference model for the baseline of the 2012 study, was upgraded in model year 2013 to achieve a rating of 0.30 kWh/mile, a 12% improvement over the 2011 model year model rating of 0.34 kWh/mile. Also, some new models are cleaner than the average, such as the BMW i3, which is rated at 0.27 kWh by the EPA. In states with a cleaner mix generation, the gains were larger. States with dirtier generation that rely heavily on coal still lag, such as Colorado, where the average BEV only achieves the same emissions as a  gasoline-powered car. The author of the 2014 analysis noted that the benefits are not distributed evenly across the U.S. because electric car adoption is concentrated in the states with cleaner power.

2015 study

In November 2015 the Union of Concerned Scientists published a new report comparing two battery electric vehicles (BEVs) with similar gasoline vehicles by examining their global warming emissions over their full life-cycle, cradle-to-grave analysis. The two BEVs modeled, midsize and full-size, are based on the two most popular BEV models sold in the United States in 2015, the Nissan Leaf and the Tesla Model S. The study found that all-electric cars representative of those sold today, on average produce less than half the global warming emissions of comparable gasoline-powered vehicles, despite taken into account the higher emissions associated with BEV manufacturing. Considering the regions where the two most popular electric cars are being sold, excess manufacturing emissions are offset within 6 to 16 months of average driving. The study also concluded that driving an average EV results in lower global warming emissions than driving a gasoline car that gets  in regions covering two-thirds of the U.S. population, up from 45% in 2009. Based on where EVs are being sold in the United States in 2015, the average EV produces global warming emissions equal to a gasoline vehicle with a  fuel economy rating. The authors identified two main reason for the fact that EV-related emissions have become even lower in many parts of the country since the first study was conducted in 2012. Electricity generation has been getting cleaner, as coal-fired generation has declined while lower-carbon alternatives have increased. In addition, electric cars are becoming more efficient. For example, the Nissan Leaf and the Chevrolet Volt, have undergone improvements to increase their efficiencies compared to the original models launched in 2010, and other even more efficient BEV models, such as the most lightweight and efficient BMW i3, have entered the market.

National Bureau of Economic Research
One criticism to the UCS analysis and several other that have analyze the benefits of PEVs is that these analysis were made using average emissions rates across regions instead of marginal generation at different times of the day. The former approach does not take into account the generation mix within interconnected electricity markets and shifting load profiles throughout the day. An analysis by three economist affiliated with the National Bureau of Economic Research (NBER), published in November 2014, developed a methodology to estimate marginal emissions of electricity demand that vary by location and time of day across the United States. The study used emissions and consumption data for 2007 through 2009, and used the specifications for the Chevrolet Volt (all-electric range of ). The analysis found that marginal emission rates are more than three times as large in the Upper Midwest compared to the Western U.S., and within regions, rates for some hours of the day are more than twice those for others. Applying the results of the marginal analysis to plug-in electric vehicles, the NBER researchers found that the emissions of charging PEVs vary by region and hours of the day. In some regions, such as the Western U.S. and Texas,  emissions per mile from driving PEVs are less than those from driving a hybrid car. However, in other regions, such as the Upper Midwest, charging during the recommended hours of midnight to 4 a.m. implies that PEVs generate more emissions per mile than the average car currently on the road. The results show a fundamental tension between electricity load management and environmental goals as the hours when electricity is the least expensive to produce tend to be the hours with the greatest emissions. This occurs because coal-fired units, which have higher emission rates, are most commonly used to meet base-level and
off-peak electricity demand; while natural gas units, which have relatively low emissions rates, are often brought online to meet peak demand. This pattern of fuel shifting explains why emission rates tend to be higher at night and lower during periods of peak demand in the morning and evening.

Environmental footprint
In February 2014, the Automotive Science Group (ASG) published the result of a study conducted to assess the life-cycle of over 1,300 automobiles across nine categories sold in North America. The study found that among advanced automotive technologies, the Nissan Leaf holds the smallest life-cycle environmental footprint of any model year 2014 automobile available in the North American market with minimum four-person occupancy. The study concluded that the increased environmental impacts of manufacturing the battery electric technology is more than offset with increased environmental performance during operational life. For the assessment, the study used the average electricity mix of the U.S. grid in 2014. In the 2014 mid-size cars category, the Leaf also ranked as the best all-around performance, best environmental and best social performance. The Ford Focus Electric, within the 2014 compact cars category, ranked as the best all-around performance, best environmental and best social performance. The Tesla Model S ranked as the best environmental performance in the 2014 full-size cars category.

Charging infrastructure

As of February 2020, the United States had 84,866 charging points across the country, up from 19,472 in December 2013. California led with 26,219 stations, followed by New York with 4,541. There were 592 CHAdeMO quick charging stations across the country by April 2014.

Among the charging networks are Electrify America, launched in May 2019 as part of VW's settlement for the Dieselgate emissions scandal, and the Electric Highway Coalition, announced in March 2021, a group of six major power utilities in the Southeast and Midwest installing EV charging across 16 states, with the first chargers targeted for opening in 2022.

Car2Go made San Diego the only North American city with an all-electric carsharing fleet when it launched service in 2011. , the carsharing service has 40,000 members and 400 all-electric Smart EDs in operation. However, due to lack of enough charging infrastructure Car2Go decided to replace all of its all-electric car fleet with gasoline-powered cars starting on 1 May 2016.  When the carsharing service started Car2Go expected 1,000 charging stations to be deployed around the city, but only 400 were in place by early 2016. As a result, an average of 20% of the carsharing fleet is unavailable at any given time because the cars are either being charged or because they don't have enough electricity in them to be driven. Also, many of the company's San Diego members say they often worry their Car2Go will run out of charge before they finish their trip. Car2Go merged with ReachNow into Share Now, which closed its North American operations in February 2020.

Charging stations by state
EV Charging by State

Plug-in Electric Vehicle Readiness Index 

Researchers from the Indiana University School of Public and Environmental Affairs developed an index that identifies and ranks the municipal plug-in electric vehicle readiness ("PEV readiness"). The evaluation ranked the U.S. 25 largest cities by population along with five other large cities that have been included in other major PEV studies. The rankings also included the largest cities in states that joined California zero-emissions vehicle goal. A total of 36 major U.S. cities were included in the study. The evaluation found that Portland, Oregon ranks at the top of the list of major American cities that are the most ready to accommodate plug-in electric vehicles.

Readiness is the degree to which adoption of electric vehicles is supported, as reflected in the presence of various types of policy instruments, infrastructure development, municipal investments in PEV technology, and participation in relevant stakeholder coalitions. The study also compares cities within states that participate in the Zero Emission Vehicle program, with those that do not, with the objective to understand whether participation in that program has a meaningful impact on PEV readiness.

In order to accelerate the adoption of plug-in electric vehicles (PEV), many municipalities, along with their parent states, offer a variety of benefits to owners and operators of PEVs to make PEV adoption easier and more affordable. All six cities in the top of the ranking offer purchase incentives for PEVs and charging equipment. Four of the six offer time-of-use electricity rates, which makes overnight charging more affordable. The top-ranking cities also score well in categories such as public charging station density, special parking privileges, access to high occupancy vehicle (HOV) lanes, and streamlined processes for installing charging equipment. Those services and incentives are largely absent from the bottom six cities.

The following is the full ranking of the 36 U.S. cities in 25 states included in the evaluation of PEV readiness:

Markets and sales

National market 

, cumulative sales of highway legal plug-in electric passenger cars in the U.S. totaled 2,322,291 units since 2010. , the U.S. stock consisting of 1,008,118 electric cars (62.7%) and 600,143 plug-in hybrids (37.3%). , the American stock represented 20% of the global plug-in car fleet in use, down from about 40% in 2014. Sales in the American market are led by California with 668,827 plug-in electric vehicles sold up until 2019.

, the United States had the world's largest stock of light-duty plug-in electric vehicles, and led annual plug-in car sales in calendar year 2014. By May 2016, the European stock of light-duty had surpassed the U.S. By the end of September 2016, the Chinese stock of plug-in passenger cars reached the level of the American plug-in stock, and by November 2016, China's cumulative total plug-in passenger vehicles sales had surpassed those of Europe, allowing China to become the market with the world's largest stock of light-duty plug-in electric vehicles. China also surpassed both the U.S. and Europe in terms of annual sales of light-duty plug-in electric vehicles since 2015.

National sales increased from 17,800 units delivered in 2011 to 53,200 during 2012, and reached 97,100 in 2013, up 83% from the previous year. During 2014 plug-in electric car sales totaled 123,347 units, up 27.0% from 2013, and fell to 114,248 units in 2015, down 7.4% from 2014. A total of 157,181 plug-in cars were sold in 2016, up 37.6% from 2015, rose to 199,818 in 2017, and achieved a record sales volume of 361,307 units in 2018. Sales declined in 2019 to 329,528 units.

The market share of plug-in electric passenger cars increased from 0.14% in 2011 to 0.37% in 2012, 0.62% in 2013, and reached 0.75% of new car sales in 2014. As plug-in car sales slowed down during the 2015, the segment's market share fell to 0.66% of new car sales, then increased to 0.90% in 2016. The market share passed the 1% mark for the first time in 2017 (1.13%). Then in 2018 the take-rate rose to 2.1%, but declined to 1.9% in 2019.

In July 2016, the Volt became the first plug-in vehicle in the American market to achieve the 100,000 unit sales milestone. Leaf sales achieved the 100,000 unit milestone in October 2016, becoming the first all-electric vehicle in the country to pass that mark. The Model S achieved the mark of 100,000 sales in the U.S. in June 2017, launched in June 2012, the Model S hit this milestone quicker than both the Volt and the Leaf. Launched in July 2017, the Tesla Model 3 reached the 100,000 unit milestone in November 2018, hitting this milestone quicker than any previous model sold in the U.S.

, the Chevrolet Volt plug-in hybrid listed as the all-time best selling plug-in electric car with 152,144 units of both generations. The Model S was the best selling plug-in car in the U.S. for three consecutive years, from 2015 to 2017, and the Model 3 topped sales in 2018 and 2019. The Model 3 surpassed in 2019 the discontinued Chevrolet Volt to become the all-time best selling plug-in car in U.S. history, with an estimated 300,471 units delivered since inception, followed by the Tesla Model S all-electric car with about 157,992, and the Chevrolet Volt with 157,054.

Sales by powertrain 

, cumulative sales of plug-in electric vehicles in the U.S. since December 2010 were led by plug-in hybrids, with 150,946 units sold representing 52.7% of all plug-in car sales, while 135,444 all-electric cars (47.3%) had been delivered to retail customers. During 2015, the all-electric segment grew much faster, with a total of 72,303 all-electric cars sold, up 6.6% year-on-year, while plug-in hybrid were down 22.4% year-on-year, with 42,959 units sold. The lead of battery electric cars continued in 2016, with 84,246 all-electrics sold, up 18.4% from 2015, representing 53.6% of the plug-in segment 2016 sales, while sales of plug-in hybrids totaled 72,935 unis, up 69.1% from 2015. , the distribution of cumulative sales since 2010 between these two technologies is 52.8% all-electrics and 47.2% plug-in hybrids.

Sales growth 

Sales of series production plug-in cars during its first two years in the U.S. market were lower than the initial expectations. Cumulative plug-in electric car sales since 2008 reached the 250,000 units in August 2014, 500,000 in August 2016, and the one million goal was achieved in September 2018.

According to the U.S. Department of Energy, combined sales of plug-in hybrids and battery electric cars are climbing more rapidly and outselling by more than double sales of hybrid-electric vehicles over their respective 24 month introductory periods, as shown in the graph at the right.

A more detailed analysis by the Office of Energy Efficiency and Renewable Energy over the same two-year introductory periods found that except for the initial months in the market, monthly sales of the Volt and the Leaf have been higher than the Prius HEV, and the Prius PHEV has outsold the regular Prius during its 8 months in the market. Over the first 24 months from introduction, the Prius HEV achieved monthly sales of over 1,700 in month 18, the Leaf achieved about 1,700 units in month 7, the Prius PHEV achieved nearly 1,900 sales in month 8, and the Volt achieved more than 2,900 sales in month 23. A 2016 analysis by the Consumer Federation of America (CFA) found that 5 years after its introduction, sales of plug-in electric cars in the U.S. continued to outsell conventional hybrids. The analysis considered sales between January 2011 and December 2015.

An analysis by Scientific American found a similar trend at the international level when considering the global top selling PEVs over a 36-month introductory period. Monthly sales of the Volt, Prius PHV and Leaf are performing better than the conventional Prius during their respective introductory periods, with the exception of the Mitsubishi i-MiEV, which has been outsold most of the time by the Prius HEV over their 36-month introductory periods.

Key market features 

According to Edmunds.com, leasing of plug-in cars instead of purchasing is dominant in the American market, with leasing accounting for 51% of all new all-electric cars and 73% of plug-in hybrids, compared with just 32% of gasoline-powered cars in 2016.

, the market of used plug-in electric cars is concentrated in California, the state with the biggest pool of used plug-in vehicles, especially all-electrics, followed by Colorado, Florida, Georgia, New York, Oregon and Texas. With the exception of used Teslas, all models depreciate more rapidly than conventionally powered cars and trucks. For all-electric cars depreciation varies between 60% to 75% in three years. In contrast, most conventionally powered vehicles in the same period depreciate between 45% to 50% . The Tesla Model S is more like conventional cars, with three-year depreciation of about 40%. And plug-in hybrids depreciate less than all-electric cars but still depreciate faster than conventionally powered cars.

Researchers from the University of California, Davis conducted a study to identify the factors influencing the decision to adopt high-end battery electric vehicles (BEV), such as the Tesla Model S, as these vehicles are remarkably different from mainstream BEVs. Based on a questionnaire responded by 539 high-end adopters and in-depth interviews with 33 adopters, the 2016 study found that "environmental, performance, and technological motivations are reasons for adoption; the new technology brings a new segment of buyers into the market; and financial purchase incentives are not important in the consumer’s decision to adopt a high-end BEV."

Car dealers' reluctance to sell 

With the exception of Tesla Motors, almost all new cars in the United States are sold through dealerships, so they play a crucial role in the sales of electric vehicles, and negative attitudes can hinder early adoption of plug-in electric vehicles. Dealers decide which cars they want to stock, and a salesperson can have a big impact on how someone feels about a prospective purchase. Sales people have ample knowledge of internal combustion cars while they do not have time to learn about a technology that represents a fraction of overall sales. As with any new technology, and in the particular case of advanced technology vehicles, retailers are central to ensuring that buyers, especially those switching to a new technology, have the information and support they need to gain the full benefits of adopting this new technology. A 2016 study indicated that 60% of Americans were not aware of electric cars.

There are several reasons for the reluctance of some dealers to sell plug-in electric vehicles. PEVs do not offer car dealers the same profits as gasoline-powered cars. Plug-in electric vehicles take more time to sell because of the explaining required, which hurts overall sales and sales people commissions. Electric vehicles also may require less maintenance, resulting in loss of service revenue, and thus undermining the biggest source of dealer profits, their service departments. According to the National Automobile Dealers Association (NADS), dealers on average make three times as much profit from service as they do from new car sales. However, a NADS spokesman said there was not sufficient data to prove that electric cars would require less maintenance. According to the New York Times, BMW and Nissan are among the companies whose dealers tend to be more enthusiastic and informed, but only about 10% of dealers are knowledgeable on the new technology.

A study conducted at the Institute of Transportation Studies (ITS), at the University of California, Davis (UC Davis) published in 2014 found that many car dealers are less than enthusiastic about plug-in vehicles. ITS conducted 43 interviews with six automakers and 20 new car dealers selling plug-in vehicles in California's major metro markets. The study also analyzed national and state-level J.D. Power 2013 Sales Satisfaction Index (SSI) study data on customer satisfaction with new car dealerships and Tesla retail stores. The researchers found that buyers of plug-in electric vehicles were significantly less satisfied and rated the dealer purchase experience much lower than buyers of non-premium conventional cars, while Tesla Motors earned industry-high scores. According to the findings, plug-in buyers expect more from dealers than conventional buyers, including product knowledge and support that extends beyond traditional offerings.

In 2014 Consumer Reports published results from a survey conducted with 19 secret shoppers that went to 85 dealerships in four states, making anonymous visits between December 2013 and March 2014. The secret shoppers asked a number of specific questions about cars to test the salespeople's knowledge about electric cars. The consumer magazine decided to conduct the survey after several consumers who wanted to buy a plug-in car reported to the organization that some dealerships were steering them toward gasoline-powered models. The survey found that not all sales people seemed enthusiastic about making PEV sales; a few outright discouraged it, and even one dealer was reluctant to even show a plug-in model despite having one in stock. And many sales people seemed not to have a good understanding of electric-car tax breaks and other incentives or of charging needs and costs. Consumer Reports also found that when it came to answering basic questions, sales people at Chevrolet, Ford, and Nissan dealerships tended to be better informed than those at Honda and Toyota. The survey found that most of the Toyota dealerships visited recommended against buying a Prius Plug-in and suggested buying a standard Prius hybrid instead. Overall, the secret shoppers reported that only 13 dealers "discouraged sale of EV," with seven of them being in New York. However, at 35 of the 85 dealerships visited, the secret shoppers said sales people recommended buying a gasoline-powered car instead.

The ITS-Davis study also found that a small but influential minority of dealers have introduced new approaches to better meet the needs of plug-in customers. Examples include marketing carpool lane stickers, enrolling buyers in charging networks, and preparing incentive paperwork for customers. Some dealers assign seasoned sales people as plug-in experts, many of whom drive plug-ins themselves to learn and be familiar with the technology and relate the cars' benefits to potential buyers. The study concluded also that carmakers could do much more to support dealers selling PEVs.

Regional markets

Concentration relative to population 

, the U.S. average concentration was 1.51 plug-in cars registered per 1,000 people, while California's concentration was 5.83 registrations per 1,000 people. At the time, only Norway exceeded California's plug-in concentration per capita, by 3.69 times. , the average national ownership per capita rose to 2.21 plug-ins per 1,000 people.

In 2017 eight states had more than two plug-in vehicles registered per 1,000 people, of which, three are located in the West Coast. California had the highest concentration with 8.64 plug-ins per 1,000 people. Hawaii ranked second (5.12) followed by Washington (4.06), Oregon (3.84) Vermont (3.73), Colorado (2.33), Arizona (2.29), and Maryland (2.03). Mississippi (0.20), Arkansas (0.28), West Virginia (0.30), Louisiana (0.31), Wyoming (0.37), and North Dakota (0.39) had the lowest concentration of plug-in cars  in 2017. In terms of growth from 2016 to 2017 for plug-in vehicle registrations per capita, five states had growth rates of 50% or higher: Vermont (56.4%)  Maryland (54.2%), Massachusetts (52.5%), New Hampshire (50.2%), and Alaska (50.0%). The U.S. average growth rate from 2016 to 2017 was 30.2%.

Market share by city and state 

The following table summarizes the ten states and metropolitan areas leading all-electric car adoption in terms of their market share of new light-vehicle registrations or sales during 2013 and 2014.

A total of 52% of American plug-in electric car registrations from January to May 2013 were concentrated in five metropolitan areas: San Francisco (19.5%), Los Angeles (15.4%), Seattle (8.0%), New York (4.6%) and Atlanta (4.4%). From January to July 2013, the three cities with the highest all-electric car registrations were all located in California, Atherton and Los Altos in the Silicon Valley, followed by Santa Monica, located in Los Angeles County.

Sales by model 

, there were 43 highway legal plug-in cars available in the American market for retail sales, 15 all-electric cars and 28 plug-in hybrids, plus several models of electric motorcycles, utility vans and neighborhood electric vehicles (NEVs). , sales were concentrated to a few models, with the top 10 best selling plug-in cars accounting for about 84% of total sales during the first eleven months of 2018. Car manufacturers are offering plug-in electric cars in the U.S. for retail customers under 21 brands or marques: Audi, BMW, Cadillac, Chevrolet, Chrysler, Fiat, Ford, Honda, Hyundai, Jaguar, Kia, Mercedes-Benz, MINI, Mitsubishi, Nissan, Porsche, Smart, Tesla, Toyota, Volkswagen, and Volvo.

, only the Chevrolet Volt, Nissan Leaf, Tesla's Model S and Model X, BMW i3, Mitsubishi i, Porsche Panamera S E-Hybrid, Cadillac ELR, and Ford's C-Max and Fusion Energi plug-in hybrids were available nationwide. Several models, such as the Toyota RAV4, Fiat 500e, Honda Fit EV, and Chevrolet Spark EV, are compliance cars sold in limited markets, mainly California, available in order to raise an automaker's fleet average fuel economy to satisfy regulator requirements.

, the top selling plug-in car manufacturers in the American market are Tesla with about 269,000 units delivered, GM with 203,941, Nissan with 126,875 units, Ford with 111,715, Toyota with 93,011 and the BMW Group with 79,679 plug-in electric cars.

Top selling models 

The Nissan Leaf was the U.S. top selling plug-in car in 2011 (9,674), and the Chevrolet Volt topped sales in 2012 (23,461). Again in 2013, sales were led by the Chevrolet Volt with 23,094 units, followed by the Nissan Leaf with 22,610 cars, and the Tesla Model S with about 18,000 units. In 2013 the Model S was the top selling car in the American full-size luxury sedan category, ahead of the Mercedes-Benz S-Class (13,303), the top selling car in the category in 2012. In 2014 the Leaf took the sales lead, with 30,200 units sold, with the Volt ranking second with 18,805, followed by the Model S with 16,689 units.

The Tesla Model S, with 25,202 units delivered, was the top selling plug-in car in 2015, followed by the Nissan Leaf with 17,269 units, and the Volt with 15,393. Again in 2016, the Model S was the best selling plug-in car with about 29,156 units delivered, followed by the Volt with 24,739, and the Model X with about 18,028. For the third consecutive year, the Tesla Model S was the top selling plug-in car with about 26,500 units sold in 2017, followed by the Chevrolet Bolt (23,297), Tesla Model X (~21,700).

Sales in 2018 were led by the Tesla Model 3 with an estimated 139,782 units delivered, the first time a plug-in car sold more than 100 thousand units in a single year. Ranking next were the Toyota Prius Prime (27,595) and the Tesla Model X (~26,100). Sales in 2019 were topped again by the Tesla Model 3 with an estimated 158,925 units delivered, followed by the Toyota Prius Prime (23,630), the Tesla Model X (19,225), the Chevrolet Bolt EV (16,418) and the Tesla Model S (14,100).

The following table presents cumulative sales of the all-time top 10 best-selling highway-capable plug-in electric cars launched in the American market since 2008, with sales through December 2020.

Neighborhood electric vehicles 

LSVs, more commonly known as neighborhood electric vehicles (NEVs), were defined in 1998 by the National Highway Traffic Safety Administration's Federal Motor Vehicle Safety Standard No. 500, which required safety features such as windshields and seat belts, but not doors or side walls.

Since 1998 Global Electric Motorcars (GEM), the market leader in North America, has sold more than 50,000 GEM battery-electric vehicles worldwide .

Modern production timeline 

This is a list of all highway-capable plug-in electric vehicles available for retail customers in the U.S. for sale or leasing since the early 1990s.

1990-2003 
Chrysler TEVan (1993-1995)
General Motors EV1 (1996-2003)
Toyota RAV4 EV (1997-2003)
Honda EV Plus (1997-1999)
Nissan Altra (1998-2001)
Dodge Caravan EPIC (1999 to 2001)
Ford TH!NK City (1999-2003)

2008-2021 
2008
 Tesla Roadster (production ended in 2011)

2009
 Mini E (demonstration program ended in 2011)

2010
Chevrolet Volt (replaced by second generation in 2015)
Nissan Leaf (replaced by second generation in 2017)
Navistar eStar utility van

2011
Th!nk City (no longer in production)
Smart ED 2nd gen (available for leasing only)
Wheego Whip LiFe (no longer in production)
Fisker Karma (no longer in production)
Azure Transit Connect Electric delivery van (no longer in production)
Mitsubishi i (Mitsubishi i MiEV in the rest of the world)
Smith Newton delivery truck

2012
BMW ActiveE (demonstration program ended in 2014)
Coda (no longer in production)
Ford Focus Electric  (limited production)
Toyota Prius PHV (production ended in 2015)
Boulder DV-500 delivery truck
Amp Electric Vehicles (SUV and light truck conversions)
Tesla Model S
Honda Fit EV (limited production)
Toyota RAV4 EV (2nd gen)  (limited production)
Ford C-Max Energi (production ended in 2018)

2013
Honda Accord Plug-in Hybrid
Ford Fusion Energi
Scion iQ EV (limited production available only for carsharing fleets, not for retail customers)
Smart electric drive 3rd gen (available with battery leasing option)
Chevrolet Spark EV (limited production)
Fiat 500e (limited production)
Porsche Panamera S E-Hybrid
Cadillac ELR (limited production)

2014
BMW i3
Porsche 918 Spyder (limited edition)
Mercedes-Benz B-Class Electric Drive
BMW i8 (production ended in 2020)
Volkswagen e-Golf
Kia Soul EV
Porsche Cayenne S E-Hybrid

2015
Mercedes-Benz S 500 Plug-in Hybrid
Volvo XC 90 PHEV
Tesla Model X
Bolloré Bluecar (available only for the BlueIndy carsharing fleet - ended in 2020)
Chevrolet Volt (second generation) (production ended in 2019)
BMW X5 xDrive40e
Hyundai Sonata PHEV
Audi A3 Sportback e-tron
Audi Q7 e-tron Quattro

2016
BMW 330e iPerformance
Mercedes-Benz GLE 550e Plug-in Hybrid
Toyota Prius Prime (second generation Prius PHEV)
Chevrolet Bolt EV
BMW 740e iPerformance
Mercedes-Benz C 350e Plug-in Hybrid

2017
Chrysler Pacifica Hybrid
BMW 530e iPerformance
Tesla Model 3
Kia Optima PHEV
Honda Clarity Electric
Honda Clarity Plug-in Hybrid
Volvo XC60 Plug-in Hybrid
Mini Cooper S E ALL4
Hyundai Ioniq Electric
Cadillac CT6 Plug-in Hybrid
Volvo S90 T8 Plug-in Hybrid
Mitsubishi Outlander P-HEV
Nissan Leaf (second generation)

2018
Hyundai Ioniq Plug-in
Mercedes-Benz GLC 350e 4MATIC
Karma Revero (updated version of the Fisker Karma) 
Jaguar I-Pace

2019

Hyundai Kona
Subaru Crosstrek Plug-in Hybrid
Kia e-Niro
Audi e-tron
Mercedes-Benz EQC
Porsche Taycan

2020
Toyota RAV4 Prime
Tesla Model Y
Kandi K23 and K27
Electra Meccanica SOLO (three-wheeler)
Ford Mustang Mach-E
Volvo V60 PHEV Engine Polestar
Volvo S60 Plug-in Hybrid
Polestar 1
Polestar 2

2021
Volkswagen ID.4
Volvo XC40 Recharge
Chevrolet Bolt EUV
Ford Escape PHEV
Lincoln Corsair Grand Touring PHEV
Lucid Air
Mazda MX-30
Rivian R1T pickup truck

Future cars and trucks (2021–2024) 

The following is a list of electric cars and plug-in hybrids with market launch in the United States scheduled up to 2024.

Nissan Ariya
GMC Hummer EV
Ford F-150 Lightning
Hyundai Ioniq 5
Kia EV6
BMW i4
BMW iX
Mercedes-Benz EQB
Mercedes-Benz EQS
Mercedes-Benz EQS SUV
Chevrolet Blazer EV
Chevrolet Equinox EV
Chevrolet Silverado EV
Cadillac Escalade IQ
Cadillac Lyriq
Cadillac Celestiq
Polestar 3
Volvo C40 Recharge
Volvo EX90
BrightDrop Zevo
Tesla Cybertruck
Lordstown Endurance pickup truck
Honda Prologue
Tesla Roadster second generation
Toyota bZ4X
Subaru Solterra
Fisker eMotion
Fisker Ocean
Aptera (solar electric vehicle)
Bentley Continental Plug-In Hybrid
Audi Q4 e-tron
Canoo Lifestyle

U.S. electric vehicle organizations 
CalCars (The California Cars Initiative)'
Drive Electric Colorado - partnership of Colorado Energy Office and several non-profit advocacy groups
Drive Oregon
Electric Auto Association of Northern Nevada
Electric Auto Association Silicon Valley
Electric Car Society
Electric Vehicle Association (EVA) (North America)
Humboldt Electric Vehicle Association
NEDRA National Electric Drive Racing Association
Oregon Electric Vehicle Association
Plug In America
PHEV Research Center
Project EVIE
RechargeIT (Google.org)
San Francisco BayLEAFs
Seattle Electric Vehicle Association
World Electric Vehicle Association
Zero Emission Transportation Association (ZETA) - industry group advocating for 100% EV sales by 2030; members include various businesses throughout the EV value chain: EV manufacturers (cars, pickups, buses), ride-sharing, EV batteries (raw materials, manufacture, recycling), EV charging, solar EV installation, electric companies.

See also 

 CalCars
 Plug In America
 Electric car use by country
 Government incentives for plug-in electric vehicles
 Hybrid electric vehicles in the United States
 List of modern production plug-in electric vehicles
 List of modern production plug-in electric vehicles available in the United States
 New energy vehicles in China
 Plug-in electric vehicles in Canada
 Plug-in electric vehicles in Europe
 Plug-in electric vehicles in France
 Plug-in electric vehicles in Germany
 Plug-in electric vehicles in Japan
 Plug-in electric vehicles in the Netherlands
 Plug-in electric vehicles in Norway
 Plug-in electric vehicles in Sweden
 Plug-in electric vehicles in the United Kingdom

References

External links

18 Hurdles Electrified Vehicles Are Having To Overcome, HybridCARS, May 2016.
2013 VehicleTechnologies Market Report, Oak Ridge National Laboratory
 2013 ZEV Action Plan: A roadmap toward 1.5 million zero-emission vehicles on California roadways by 2025, Office of the Governor of California, February 2013.
 AAA Electric Vehicle webpage (American Automobile Association)
 A Guide to the Lessons Learned from the Clean Cities Community Electric Vehicle Readiness Projects, Clean Cities, U.S. Department of Energy, January 2013.
 California: Beyond cars? Bulletin of the Atomic Scientists, Tom Turrentine, August 2014.
 Clean Car Calculator (Institute for Energy Efficiency)
 Clean Cities - 2014 Vehicle Buyer's Guide, National Renewable Energy Laboratory (NREL), U.S. Department of Energy, December 2013.
 Cleaner Cars from Cradle to Grave, Union of Concerned Scientists, November 2015.
 Cradle-to-Grave Lifecycle Analysis of U.S. Light-Duty Vehicle-Fuel Pathways: A Greenhouse Gas Emissions and Economic Assessment of Current (2015) and Future (2025-2030) Technologies (includes estimated cost of avoided GHG emissions from BEVs and PHEVs in the U.S.), Argonne National Laboratory, June 2016.
 Driving Cleaner - More Electric Vehicles Mean Less Pollution,  Environment North Carolina Research & Policy Center, June 2014.
 Early Plug-in Electric Vehicle Sales: Trends, Forecasts, and Determinants, Luskin Center for Innovation, UCLA, July 2012
Effects of Federal Tax Credits for the Purchase of Electric Vehicles Congressional Budget Office, September 2012
 Effects of Regional Temperature on Electric Vehicle Efficiency, Range, and Emissions in the United States, Tugce Yuksel and Jeremy Michalek, Carnegie Mellon University. 2015
 eGallon Calculator: Compare the costs of driving with electricity, U.S. Department of Energy
 Electric drive vehicle sales figures (U.S. Market) - EV sales, Electric Drive Transportation Association 
 Electric drive vehicle sales 2012->now, animation
 Electric Vehicles and Public Charging Infrastructure: Impediments and Opportunities for Success in the United States, Texas A&M Transportation Institute, July 2013
 Electric Vehicle Guide, Sierra Club
 Electric Vehicle Paradise: How Hawai'i Can Lead the World in Deployment, Center for Law, Energy and the Environment at the University of California, Berkeley, September 2013
 Electric Vehicle Sales Analysis, Luskin Center for Innovation, UCLA, August 2013
Electric Vehicle Timeline: Electric Cars, Plug-In Hybrids, and Fuel Cell Vehicles (1900-2014), Union of Concerned Scientists
Emissions Associated with Electric Vehicle Charging: Impact of Electricity Generation Mix, Charging Infrastructure Availability, and Vehicle Type, National Renewable Energy Laboratory, U.S. Department of Energy, April 2016.
 EPA Green Vehicle Guide
 EV Driver Survey Dashboard, California's Clean Vehicle Rebate Project (CVRP)
 EV Everywhere Grand Challenge Blueprint, U.S. Department of Energy, January 2013.
 Evaluating the Impact of High Occupancy Vehicle (HOV) Lane Access on Plug-In Vehicles (PEVs) Purchasing and Usage in California, University of California, Davis, Working Paper UCD-ITS-WP-14-01, 2014
Exploring the Impact of the Federal Tax Credit on the Plug-In Vehicle Market, Journal of the Transportation Research Board, 2016.
 Fact Sheet: Plug-in Electric Vehicles (2014), Environmental and Energy Study Institute, June 2014.
Federal Tax Credits For Plug-In Hybrids, Electric Cars: What You Need To Know, The Washington Post, August 2014.
 Global EV Outlook - Understanding the Electric Vehicle Landscape to 2020, International Energy Agency (IEA), April 2013
How Clean is Your Electric Vehicle?, Union of Concerned Scientists on-line tool to calculate carbon emissions for a given plug-in car model according to the corresponding U.S. ZIP code.
 Influence of driving patterns on life cycle cost and emissions of hybrid and plug-in electric vehicle powertrains, Carnegie Mellon Vehicle Electrification Group
Leading Edge of Electric Vehicle Market Development in the United States: An Analysis of California Cities, International Council on Clean Transportation, White Paper, September 2016.
 Light-Duty Automotive Technology, Carbon Dioxide Emissions, and Fuel Economy Trends: 1975 Through 2014 (See Chapter 7), U.S. Environmental Protection Agency, October 2014.
Light Duty Electric Drive Vehicles Monthly Sales Updates, Argonne National Laboratory
 List of vehicles eligible for California's single occupant carpool lane stickers
 List of U.S. Electric Vehicle and EVSE Incentives by State, September 2014
Model Year 2014 Fuel Economy Guide, U.S. Environmental Protection Agency and U.S. Department of Energy, August 2014 (see pp. 33–36 for plug-in electric models available).
 New Car Dealers and Retail Innovation in California’s Plug-In Electric Vehicle Market. Institute of Transportation Studies, University of California, Davis, Working Paper UCD-ITS-WP-14-04, 2014.
 Overcoming Barriers to Electric-Vehicle Deployment: Interim Report (2013), Transportation Research Board, U.S. National Research Council
 Plug-In Electric Vehicles: A Case Study of Seven Markets (Norway, Netherlands, California, United States, France, Japan, and Germany), UC Davis, October 2014.
 Plug-In Electric Vehicle Handbook for Workplace Charging Hosts, Clean Cities, U.S. Department of Energy, August 2013 
 Plug-in Electric Vehicles: the First Three Years (of the post-modern electric-vehicle era) Dec 2010 — Nov 2013,  Luskin Center for Innovation, UCLA, December 2013
 Qualified Plug-In Electric Drive Motor Vehicles (IRC 30D), Internal Revenue Service (IRS), June 2014
 Roadmap to Climate-Friendly Cars: 2013, Climate Central, August 2013.
 State of the Plug-in Electric Vehicle Market, Electrification Coalition, July 2013.
 Supporting the Plug-In Electric Vehicle Market - Best Practices from State Programs, Georgetown Climate Center, December 2014.
 The Great Debate -- All-Electric Cars vs. Plug-In Hybrids, April 2014.
 Top Ten EPA-Rated Fuel Sippers (2014) - including BEVs and PHEVs
 U.S. PEV Sales by Model, Alternative Fuels and Advanced Vehicle Data Center, U.S. Department of Energy

United States
 
United States
Road transportation in the United States